Ibrahim Diallo may refer to:
 Ibrahim Diallo (footballer)
 Ibrahim Diallo (rugby union)

See also
 Ibrahima Diallo (disambiguation)